The open J/80 competition at the 2010 Asian Games in Shanwei was held from 16 to 20 November 2010. The competition was match race format. It consisted of a round-robin a semi-finals and final series. The top four crews from the round-robin were seeded into the semifinal.

Schedule
All times are China Standard Time (UTC+08:00)

Squads

Results

Round robin

Knockout round

References

External links
 

Open match racing